
Year 374 BC was a year of the pre-Julian Roman calendar. At the time, it was known as the Second year without Tribunate or Consulship (or, less frequently, year 380 Ab urbe condita). The denomination 374 BC for this year has been used since the early medieval period, when the Anno Domini calendar era became the prevalent method in Europe for naming years.

Events 
 By place 
 Greece 
 Athens tries to retire from the Theban-Spartan war and makes peace with Sparta. However, the peace is quickly broken.
 Sparta attacks Corcyra, enlisting Syracusan help. Athens comes to the island's aid. The Athenian general, Timotheus, captures Corcyra and defeats the Spartans at sea off Alyzia (Acarnania).

 Cyprus 
 The King of Salamis, Evagoras, is assassinated. He is succeeded by his son, Nicocles, who continues his father's liberal Hellenising policy in Cyprus, encouraged by Isocrates, who writes his Exhortation to Nicocles.

Births

Deaths 
 Evagoras, king of Salamis in Cyprus (assassinated)

References